The free will theorem of John H. Conway and Simon B. Kochen states that if we have a free will in the sense that our choices are not a function of the past, then, subject to certain assumptions, so must some elementary particles. Conway and Kochen's paper was published in Foundations of Physics in 2006. In 2009, the authors published a stronger version of the theorem in the Notices of the American Mathematical Society. Later, in 2017, Kochen elaborated some details.

Axioms
The proof of the theorem as originally formulated relies on three axioms, which Conway and Kochen call "fin", "spin", and "twin". The spin and twin axioms can be verified experimentally.
 Fin: There is a maximal speed for propagation of information (not necessarily the speed of light). This assumption rests upon causality.
 Spin: The squared spin component of certain elementary particles of spin one, taken in three orthogonal directions, will be a permutation of (1,1,0).
 Twin: It is possible to "entangle" two elementary particles and separate them by a significant distance, so that they have the same squared spin results if measured in parallel directions.  This is a consequence of quantum entanglement, but full entanglement is not necessary for the twin axiom to hold (entanglement is sufficient but not necessary).

In their later 2009 paper, "The Strong Free Will Theorem", Conway and Kochen replace the Fin axiom by a weaker one called Min, thereby strengthening the theorem. Min asserts only that two experimenters separated in a space-like way can make choices of measurements independently of each other. In particular it is not postulated that the speed of transfer of all information is subject to a maximum limit, but only of the particular information about choices of measurements. In 2017, Kochen argued that Min could be replaced by Lin – experimentally testable Lorentz covariance.

The theorem 
The free will theorem states:
 
 That is an "outcome open" theorem.

Since the theorem applies to any arbitrary physical theory consistent with the axioms, it would not even be possible to place the information into the universe's past in an ad hoc way. The argument proceeds from the Kochen–Specker theorem, which shows that the result of any individual measurement of spin was not fixed independently of the choice of measurements. As stated by Cator and Landsman regarding hidden-variable theories: "There has been a similar tension between the idea that the hidden variables (in the pertinent causal past) should on the one hand include all ontological information relevant to the experiment, but on the other hand should leave the experimenters free to choose any settings they like."

Reception

According to Cator and Landsman, Conway and Kochen prove that "determinism is incompatible with a number of a priori desirable assumptions". Cator and Landsman compare the Min assumption to the locality assumption in Bell's theorem and conclude in the strong free will theorem's favor that it "uses fewer assumptions than Bell’s 1964 theorem, as no appeal to probability theory is made". The philosopher David Hodgson supports this theorem as showing quite conclusively that "science does not support determinism": that quantum mechanics proves that particles do indeed behave in a way that is not a function of the past. Some critics argue that the theorem applies only to deterministic models.

See also

Bell's inequalities
Compatibilism
Contextualism
Counterfactual definiteness
Einstein–Podolsky–Rosen paradox
Libertarianism (metaphysics)
No-communication theorem
Principle of locality
Superdeterminism
Quantum mind
Orchestrated objective reduction

Notes

References
 Conway and Kochen, The Strong Free Will Theorem, published in Notices of the AMS. Volume 56, Number 2, February 2009.

Introduction to the Free Will Theorem, videos of six lectures given by J. H. Conway, Mar. 2009.
 

Physics theorems
Free will
John Horton Conway